The Cable Music Channel (CMC) was a short-lived American basic cable channel that was owned by the Turner Broadcasting System. The all-music video channel was created by Ted Turner and launched in 1984, providing the first national competition to MTV. Turner later stated that the channel existed at the behest of the cable industry as a defense mechanism against MTV's unsuccessful attempts to increase the fees that cable providers paid to carry the channel by twofold; Turner offered the channel without any carriage fees.

Launch 
The idea of music on television was nothing new for Ted Turner. In 1970, Turner's Atlanta, Georgia independent station WTCG-TV (channel 17), aired an all-music program called The Now Explosion at night and on weekends, airing up to 28 hours a week. In 1983, Turner's superstation, which was known as WTBS at that point, launched a late night weekend music video block called Night Tracks. The success of Night Tracks led Turner to take on MTV with the Cable Music Channel.

CMC launched at 12:00 p.m. Eastern Time on October 26, 1984 with network president Robert Wussler at a podium in CMC's studios in Los Angeles introducing the network; "The Star-Spangled Banner" was then played (which was a tradition whenever a new Turner-owned network launched; that tradition would be eventually be broken when Cartoon Network launched in 1992). Afterwards, Wussler introduced CMC Vice-President and General Manager Scott Sassa to the podium. Sassa quickly greeted the crowd and then introduced 13th District Councilwoman Peggy Stevenson to the podium. Stevenson presented Ted Turner a proclamation from the City of Los Angeles signed by Los Angeles Mayor Tom Bradley and Stevenson declaring October 26, 1984 as "Cable Music Channel Day." Turner then gave a brief speech stating that the network is "gonna play a wide arrangement of music. We're gonna stay away from excessively violent or degrading clips towards women that MTV is so fond of running." After he pushed a big red button on the wall behind him and exclaimed a defiant "Take that, MTV!", the channel kicked off with CMC VJs Jeff Gonzer and Raechel Donahue introducing the Randy Newman music video "I Love L.A.".

CMC vs. MTV
MTV focused on album-oriented rock and the VJ segments were pre-recorded; CMC, however, focused on contemporary hit music (which enabled the channel to play soft rock, crossover country, dance, pop, and urban hits) and broadcast live VJ segments. CMC also provided news, sports and weather reports. Another difference between Cable Music Channel and its main competitor was that MTV's video jockeys were seen on-air; whereas CMC's video jockeys were just heard via voiceover. MTV's studios and offices were based in a New York apartment; while CMC's studios were located at The Production Group and offices were located in a Los Angeles house just down the street (as opposed to Atlanta, where the headquarters of Turner Broadcasting System are located).

CMC promoted itself as avoiding sexually and violently explicit music videos to capitalize on the perception that MTV actually played those types of videos. In fact, MTV had strict guidelines about the types of behavior that could be shown in videos and frequently returned clips to record labels for re-editing.

As a money-losing venture
It quickly became clear that CMC was losing money fast, due to an inability to reach agreements with cable providers (many of which did not have the space necessary to carry another all-music channel, and some of which had organized an unofficial boycott at the Western Cable Show in retaliation for Turner's strong-arm tactics in the battle between CNN and the fledgling Satellite News Channel) or secure the rights to play top videos (MTV was accused of pressuring artists not to sell to CMC, citing "exclusivity" agreements). Despite an estimated audience of 2.5 million, on November 29, 1984, Turner decided to sell the assets of Cable Music Channel to MTV's parent company Warner-Amex Satellite Entertainment (now Paramount Media Networks) for $1 million, with Warner-Amex agreeing to buy $500,000 worth of advertising for MTV on Turner's other channels (including CNN). WASEC used the channel (and its space on the Satcom satellite) to help form a new adult contemporary-focused sister network to MTV, VH1 (then known as Video Hits One, which featured a similar format as CMC), which launched just over a month later on January 1, 1985.

Shutdown
Cable Music Channel officially shut down just before midnight Eastern Time on November 30, 1984; the last chyroned video aired was "Take Me to Heart" by Quarterflash, followed by a sign-off listing the entire crew of CMC interspersed through the video that first launched the network one month earlier, "I Love L.A." by Randy Newman. As the screen faded to black, CMC VJ Raechel Donahue said, "Well, it's not really goodbye, you know, darlings. We'll always be there somewhere, so watch this space. Say 'Goodbye, y'all' now." A male voice (allegedly belonging to a Turner executive sent to ensure CMC signed off as ordered) replied, "Goodbye, y'all." Three seconds later, the satellite uplink was disconnected.

CMC's five-week run made it one of the shortest-lived channels in American cable television history. It was also the shortest-lived service under the umbrella of Turner Broadcasting until the company's eventual successor, Warner Bros. Discovery, shut down the streaming service CNN+, which lasted five days fewer than CMC, on April 28, 2022. CMC's background graphics were recycled for use on Night Tracks for five years after the channel's demise.

See also

 MOR Music TV
 Night Tracks
 Ted Turner
 The Tube Music Network

References

External links 
 Cable Music Channel TV ad
 Cable Music Channel's sign on & first few minutes
 Archive.org: 3 hours of Cable Music Channel (first hour, typical hour and final hour)

Music video networks in the United States
Defunct television networks in the United States
Television channels and stations established in 1984
Television channels and stations disestablished in 1984
Defunct music video networks